Minnah Caroline Karlsson (born 26 March 1989 in Hallstavik) is a Swedish singer. She achieved fame when on the television singing competition Idol in 2010, where she came in second, losing to Jay Smith.
She is also one of the few participants on any of the Idol series who was voted out, to then come back and got to the final.

Although Karlsson came in second place, Sony Music signed a contract with her. Her debut album, Minnah Karlsson, was released on December 19, 2010 for digital downloads, and for in-store purchases on 20 December, only one week after the finals.

Karlsson was also included in the Idol Live Tour, in which she and the other 9 final contestants toured around Sweden.
Adam Lambert praised her for her cover of his song "Whataya Want from Me", and the song was included on her debut album.

Family
Karlsson is the daughter of Heli and Bengt Karlsson and has two brothers. Her mother is from Finland.

Discography

Singles
 2010 -All I Need Is You (also available in Det bästa från Idol 2010)

Compilation
 2010 -Det Bästa Från Idol 2010 - Audition (Not Ready To Make Nice)
 2010 -Det Bästa Från Idol 2010 (Piece of My Heart)

Albums 
 2010 -Minnah Karlsson

References

External links
 Official Website

1989 births
Living people
Idol (Swedish TV series) participants
Swedish pop singers
Swedish people of Finnish descent
21st-century Swedish singers
21st-century Swedish women singers